In mathematics, the p-adic gamma function Γp is a function of a p-adic variable analogous to the gamma function.

Definition
The p-adic gamma function is the unique continuous function of a p-adic integer x (with values in ) such that

for positive integers x, where the product is restricted to integers i not divisible by p. Here  is the ring of p-adic integers. Thus . Here  is the set of invertible p-adic integers.

Basic properties of the p-adic gamma function 

The classical gamma function satisfies the functional equation  for any . This has an analogue with respect to the Morita gamma function:

The Euler's reflection formula  has its following simple counterpart in the p-adic case:

where  is the first digit in the p-adic expansion of x, unless , in which case  rather than 0.

Special values

and, in general,

At  the Morita gamma function is related to the Legendre symbol :

Other interesting special values come from the Gross–Koblitz formula, which was first proved by cohomological tools, and later was proved using more elementary methods. For example,

where  denotes the square root with first digit 3, and  denotes the square root with first digit 2. (Such specifications must always be done if we talk about roots.)

Another example is

p-adic Raabe formula

The Raabe-formula for the classical Gamma function says that

This has an analogue for the Iwasawa logarithm of the Morita gamma function:

The ceiling function to be understood as the p-adic limit  such that  through rational integers.

Mahler expansion

The Mahler expansion is similarly important for p-adic functions as the Taylor expansion in classical analysis. The Mahler expansion of the p-adic gamma function is the following:

where the sequence  is defined by the following identity:

See also

Gross–Koblitz formula

References

Number theory
P-adic numbers